Big Norm may refer to:

 Norman Kirk, Prime Minister of New Zealand, 1972–1974
 "Big Norm", a song about Kirk released by Ebony in 1974
 A  pig; see